Yılmaz Gökdel (20 February 1940 – 4 November 2019) was a Turkish football midfielder and later manager. He was capped 5 times for Turkey, and also managed the national team.

References

1940 births
2019 deaths
Turkish footballers
Sarıyer S.K. footballers
Beykozspor footballers
Galatasaray S.K. footballers
Vefa S.K. footballers
Turkey international footballers
Association football midfielders
Turkish football managers
Galatasaray S.K. (football) non-playing staff
Gaziantepspor managers
MKE Ankaragücü managers
Kocaelispor managers
Antalyaspor managers
Turkey national football team managers
Diyarbakırspor managers
Bursaspor managers
Samsunspor managers
Kartalspor managers
Beylerbeyi S.K. managers
Fatih Karagümrük S.K. managers
Ümraniyespor managers